Boxing ( břntsk'amart, literally "fist fight") in Armenia is a popular sport, that existed in the Armenian Highland since ancient times. Amateur boxing schools in the country appeared in early 1900s, by the mid-1950s boxing became one of the traditional sports in Armenia. In 1956, Vladimir Yengibaryan won a gold medal at the Olympics for the Soviet team. In the early 21st century, professional and amateur boxing in Armenia reached another peak. Most notably Arthur Abraham and Vic Darchinyan won several professional world champion titles. Dozens of amateur boxers have been placed in the top 3 of world and European competitions for various weight categories. Vladimir Yengibarian was among the first individuals to open professional boxing schools in Armenia. The sport is regulated by the Armenian Boxing Federation.

History

Ancient history
Boxing was practiced in the Armenian Highland since ancient times. Petroglyphs have been found in the region depicting a fight between two men, similar to boxing.

King of Armenia Varazdat (Varasdates) is often regarded as one of the last competitors in the Ancient Olympic Games. Varazdat's victory in fisticuffs is recorded in Moses of Chorene's History of Armenia. Since he reigned from 374–78, conjecture places his victory in the 360s, sometimes recorded in 369. The king's win is commemorated with a memorial plate in Olympia, Greece, at the Olympic Museum.

Modern history
The modern history of boxing in Armenia starts in the early twentieth century.

Soviet era
The Soviet regime in Armenia was established in 1920. Four years later in 1924, Gevorg Alikhanian and Mkhitar Aybabian started the first boxing school in the city of Leninakan and a year later Alikhanian started training teenage boys in Yerevan. In 1931, the first Armenian boxing championship was held among 30 boxers. The sport developed mostly in the large urban areas.

The first major success of Armenian boxing took place in 1956. Vladimir Yengibaryan of Yerevan won a gold medal for the Soviet Union at the Melbourne Olympics. Soviet Armenian boxing reached it peak during the period from 1970s to early 1990s. Notable figures of the era include Mekhak Ghazaryan and Israyel Hakobkokhyan, with the later becoming a World Amateur Champion in 1989.

In 1957 Yengibaryan was awarded both the Honoured Master of Sports of the USSR and the Order of the Red Banner of Labour for his achievements in boxing. After finishing his career, he founded the first in the USSR Boxing Children and Youth Sport School in Yerevan.

Independent era
Armenia became an independent state in 1991. The Armenian Boxing Federation, governing body of the sport in Armenia, was founded the same year. In two years it was admitted to the European Amateur Boxing Association and International Boxing Association as a full member.

Numerous professional Armenian boxers came to international fame, some representing Armenia, some foreign countries. Vic Darchinyan and Arthur Abraham both won IBF titles in Flyweight and Middleweight categories respectively are the most notable ones.

Armenia has two Boxing World Cup champions. Nshan Munchyan was undefeated in 48 kg category in 1994.  Andranik Hakobyan stood at the top of the 75 kg category in 2008. In amateur boxing, Armenian athletes have been relatively successful. Nshan Munchyan became a World Champion in 1993 in Light Flyweight. Hovhannes Danielyan (2008), Eduard Hambardzumyan (2008) and Hrachik Javakhyan (2010) became Champions of Europe.

On September 3, 2011, the first ever professional boxing event in Armenia took place in the Karen Demirchyan Sports Complex. All Armenian boxers won their matches. The event was headlined by Vic Darchinyan and Evans Mbamba. Darchinyan defeated Mbamba to retain his IBO Bantamweight title. Armenia has hosted the 2012 AIBA Youth World Boxing Championships and the Men's 2022 European Amateur Boxing Championships.

Armenia had over 3,000 people practicing box in the 21st century. In 2021 Armenia had 3,036 boxers (including 62 females) and 151 coaches and trainers.

Records

Olympics

During the Soviet era, two boxers from Yerevan, Armenian SSR also won Olympic medals. Vladimir Yengibaryan acquired a gold medal in 1956 and David Torosyan a bronze medal in 1976.

The only Olympic medal for Armenia was won by Hrachik Javakhyan at the 2008 Beijing Games.

Professional World Championships

Men
Two boxers: Vic Darchinyan and Arthur Abraham have won several world champion titles, which are listed below.

Women
German Armenian boxer Susianna Kentikian has won numerous world champion titles, which are listed below.

Amateur World Championships

European Championships

World Cup

References